The Hound of the Baskervilles is a 1972 American made-for-television mystery film directed by Barry Crane and starring Stewart Granger as Sherlock Holmes and Bernard Fox as Doctor Watson.  The movie is based on Arthur Conan Doyle's 1902 Sherlock Holmes novel The Hound of the Baskervilles.

Production
The Hound of the Baskervilles was the first American color version of the tale, and was produced by ABC-TV for their ABC Movie of the Week. The production was one of three pilots for a series of television movies featuring literary sleuths with the others being Nick Carter and Hildegarde Withers. The production utilized sets from other productions, mainly horror films.

Cast 
Stewart Granger as Sherlock Holmes
Bernard Fox as Dr. John H. Watson
Ian Ireland as Sir Henry
William Shatner as George Stapleton / Sir Hugo Baskerville
Jane Merrow as Beryl Stapleton
Anthony Zerbe as Dr. Mortimer
Sally Ann Howes as Laura Frankland
John Williams as Arthur Frankland
Alan Caillou as Inspector Lestrade

Reception 
The ratings were poor and reviews were bad which caused the proposed series of tele-films to be shelved.

The Los Angeles Times called it "laborious, talky, often poorly staged and it suffers intermittently with show and tell direction" although it thought Granger and Fox were "quite acceptable" in their roles.

References

External links 

1972 television films
1972 films
1970s mystery films
American mystery films
ABC Movie of the Week
Sherlock Holmes films
Films based on The Hound of the Baskervilles
1970s American films